Las Trampas Regional Wilderness is a  regional park located in Alameda and Contra Costa counties in Northern California. The nearest city is Danville, California. Las Trampas is Spanish for the traps, or the snares. The park belongs to the East Bay Regional Park District (EBRPD).

General
It consists of two long, hilly ridges (Las Trampas Ridge on the east and Rocky Ridge on the west) flanking a narrow valley along Bollinger Creek, which contains a horse stable and visitor parking. The park has been described as "the tough guy of the East Bay Regional Park District."

Vegetation on the southern and western slopes of the two ridges is predominantly: black sage, chamise and buck brush, with lesser amounts of toyon, hybrid manzanitas, elderberry, gooseberry, chaparral currant, sticky monkeyflower, coffeeberry, coyote bush, poison oak, hollyleaf red berry, deer weed and dozens of other species. Some of the exposed rocks contain compressed layers of fossils.

At the  elevation, there is another trail that leads across EBMUD land. The trail leads to either the Valle Vista Staging Area on Canyon Road in Moraga, or south to the Chabot staging area in Castro Valley.

Chamise and Bollinger Creek Loop trails lead to Las Trampas Ridge, east of Bollinger Creek.The ridge offers good views of the Ygnacio, San Ramon and Amador valleys, as well as Mt. Diablo and the Carquinez Straits.

There are two picnic areas, named Steelhead and Shady, near the parking lot. These are available on a first-come, first served basis and cannot be reserved. Reservable picnic sites for groups of 50 to 300 persons are at the nearby Little Hills Picnic Ranch.

Trails

Bicycles are allowed on half of the trails; equestrians and hikers on all of the trails. Dogs are allowed. Cows, calves, steers and an occasional free-ranging bull can be encountered on the trails; their grazing keeps the grass short for summer fire safety. The cattle should not be approached as they can become defensive and dangerous. Deer, raccoons, rattlesnakes, and skunks can be seen, as well as hawks, vultures and an occasional eagle.  Coyote and bobcat are common. The tracks of Mountain lion have been observed, while big-cat sightings are extremely rare. Caution should be exercised with small dogs and children, particularly after sunset with regard to wild animals. 

The most common trees are California bay laurel and coast live oak.  Other species are buckeye, big leaf maple, canyon live oak, black oak and scrub oak. The latter, with its mistletoe, seems to prefer the ridgetop habitat at the end of Chamise Trail. 

On its eastern border, the park encloses the triangular property of the Eugene O'Neill National Historic Site on all three sides, with access from Las Trampas via hiking trails or from Danville by single-lane road.  The eastern section of the park also contains several secluded waterfalls, most of which are difficult to reach.

The western-slope portion of Las Trampas is a sensitive EBMUD (East Bay Municipal Utility District) watershed, and is closed to hiking by visitors who do not have a valid EBMUD permit.

Gallery

Notes

References

External links

 Las Trampas Regional Wilderness official web page
 Topographic trail map of Las Trampas Regional Wilderness
 James Kew: resident alien. Las Trampas Regional Wilderness

East Bay Regional Park District
Parks in Alameda County, California
Parks in Contra Costa County, California